Armando De Vincentiis (born 11 October 1943) is an Italian former discus thrower.

Biography
De Vincentiis was born in Ascoli Piceno.  He has 48 caps in Italy national athletics team. In his career he participated in two editions of the Olympic Games.

Personal best
Discus throw: 64,48 -  Rome, 27 May 1976

Achievements

National titles
5 wins in discus throw at the Italian Athletics Championships (1975, 1976, 1978, 1980, 1981)

See also
 Italy national athletics team - More caps

References

External links
 

1943 births
Italian male discus throwers
Olympic athletes of Italy
Athletes (track and field) at the 1972 Summer Olympics
Athletes (track and field) at the 1976 Summer Olympics
Living people
Mediterranean Games gold medalists for Italy
Athletes (track and field) at the 1975 Mediterranean Games
Athletes (track and field) at the 1979 Mediterranean Games
Mediterranean Games medalists in athletics